The 2011 NCAA Division III men's basketball tournament was a single-elimination tournament to determine the men's collegiate basketball national champion of National Collegiate Athletic Association (NCAA) Division III. The tournament began on March 3, 2011. The tournament consists of 61 teams arranged in four sections. The top three teams earn a bye to the second round. The other 58 teams compete in the first round. The first two rounds in each section are held at campus location: four sites per section. The third and fourth rounds take place at the sectional location. The national semifinals and national championship will be held at the Salem Civic Center in Salem, Virginia.

Forty-two teams were granted automatic bids as the champion of their conference. One independent team was selected, and 18 teams were selected as at-large participants.

Qualified teams

Sectional play

Wooster, Ohio Sectional

Williamstown, Massachusetts Sectional

Rock Island, Illinois Sectional

Rochester, New York Sectional

Semifinals and National championship – Salem, Virginia

References

NCAA Division III men's basketball tournament
Ncaa Tournament